Amnesia Scanner is a Berlin-based, Finnish electronic music duo currently signed to PAN. Their debut physical EP AS was released as a vinyl exclusive in 2016. They have also collaborated with Holly Herndon and Mykki Blanco.

Discography

Studio albums
Another Life (2018)
Tearless (2020)

EPs
Angels Rig Hook (2015) (limited edition vinyl exclusive)
AS (2016) (vinyl exclusive)

Mixtapes
Cyber Monday (2015)
LEXACHAST (2016) (with Bill Kouligas)
AS Truth (2017)

References

German electronic musicians
German musical duos
German industrial music groups
Finnish electronic musicians
Finnish musical duos